Mazılı is a village in Dikili district of İzmir Province, Turkey. It is situated in the southern slopes of the mountainous area.

References

Villages in Dikili District